Tasher Ghawr is a Bengali film released on 3 September 2020 directly on the OTT platform hoichoi. Directed by Sudipto Roy the series features Swastika Mukherjee in the lead roles.

Plot
This Bengali film is about a housewife of an upper-middle-class family named Sujata who is stuck between the world that is around & within her. The story is about that world. Her home, her search, her “self”.  Swastika who previously worked for various projects for hoichoi like the iconic Dupur Thakurpo and many others series like The Stoneman Murders and Paanch Phoron Season 2 will be seen as the lead role in the movie.

The film got released directly on the OTT platform due to the COVID-19 Pandemic. The complete movie is shot during the lockdown period in India.

Cast 
Swastika Mukherjee as Sujata

References

External links
 

2020 films
Bengali-language Indian films
2020 drama films
2020s Bengali-language films
Indian drama films